Arttu Ville Eemeli Lappi (born 11 May 1984) is a Finnish former ski jumper.

Career
He won a gold medal in the team large event at the 2003 FIS Nordic World Ski Championships in Val di Fiemme and finished 6th in the individual normal hill at those same championships. Lappi's two individual victories were in individual large hill events in the United States in 2002 and in Kuusamo on November 24, 2006. His win in Kuusamo was his first World Cup victory.

World Cup

Standings

Wins

External links

Official website

1984 births
Living people
People from Kuopio
Finnish male ski jumpers
FIS Nordic World Ski Championships medalists in ski jumping
Sportspeople from North Savo
21st-century Finnish people